Satriani Live! is a live album and DVD by Joe Satriani. It was recorded on May 2, 2006, in Anaheim, California, and released on October 31, 2006.

Track listing
All songs written by Joe Satriani.

Disc 1
"Flying in a Blue Dream" - 8:38
"The Extremist" - 3:40
"Redshift Riders" - 4:46
"Cool #9" - 8:02
"A Cool New Way" - 10:00
"Satch Boogie" - 5:18
"Super Colossal" - 4:17
"Just Like Lightnin'" - 5:00
"Ice 9" - 4:28
"One Robot's Dream" - 8:02

Disc 2
"Ten Words" - 3:35
"The Mystical Potato Head Groove Thing" - 7:36
"The Meaning of Love" 4:59
"Made of Tears" - 10:23
"Circles" - 9:49
"Always with Me, Always with You" - 9:43
"Surfing with the Alien" - 7:48
"Crowd Chant" - 3:14
"Summer Song" - 9:11

Personnel
Joe Satriani - lead guitar, harmonica, keyboards
Galen Henson - rhythm guitar
Dave LaRue - bass
Jeff Campitelli - drums

Charts

Weekly charts

References

Joe Satriani live albums
2006 live albums